Master of the Mint is a title within the Royal Mint given to the most senior person responsible for its operation. It was an important office in the governments of Scotland and England, and later Great Britain and then the United Kingdom, between the 16th and 19th centuries. Until 1699, the appointment was usually for life.  Its holder occasionally sat in the cabinet.

During the interregnum (1643–1660) the last Master of the Mint to King Charles, Sir Robert Harley, transferred his allegiance to Parliament and remained in office. After his death in 1656 Aaron Guerdon was appointed.

In 1870 the role was amalgamated into the office of the Chancellor of the Exchequer, making the Chancellor, by virtue of his position, the Master of the Mint. The duty of running the mint was given to the Deputy Master of the Mint; who is now the mint's Chief Executive.

Masters of the Mint in England
1331 Richard de Snowshill and Richard of Grimsby 
1351–? Henry de Bruselee and John Chichester  
1361–1361 Walter dei Bardi 
1365–1367 John Chichester 
1375–1391 Walter dei Bardi 
1391–1391 John Wildeman 
1411–1414 Richard Garner 
1413–1414 Sir Lewis John 
1418–1420 Sir Lewis John 
1421–1432 Bartholomew Goldbeter 
1435–1446 John Paddesley  
1446–1459 Robert Manfield  
1459–1461 Sir Richard Tonstall 
1461–1483 William Hastings (executed 1483) 
1483–1485 Sir Robert Brackenbury (killed at Bosworth, 1485) 
1485–1490 Sir Giles Daubeney  
1492–1493 Sir Bartholomew Reade and Sir John Shaa
1493–1494 Sir Bartholomew Reade and Robert Fenrother  
1495–1498 Sir Bartholomew Reade and Sir John Shaa
1509–1534 William Blount, 4th Baron Mountjoy  
1543 Ralph Rowlet and Sir Martin Bowes  
1544 Sir Martin Bowes  
1547–1553 Sir John York
1553–1555 Thomas Egerton  
1560–1571 Sir Thomas Stanley  
1571–1582 John Lonyson   
1582–1599 Sir Richard Martin 
1599–1609 Sir Richard Martin (died 1616) and Richard Martin
1617–1623 Sir Edward Villiers 
1623–1626 Sir Randal Cranfield
1626–1635 Sir Robert Harley 
1635–1643 In Commission:
Sir Ralph Freeman
Sir Thomas Aylesbury
1643–1649 Sir Robert Harley 
1649–1653 Aaron Guerdon
1660–1662 Sir Ralph Freeman 
1662–1667 Sir Ralph Freeman and Henry Slingsby 
1667–1680 Henry Slingsby (suspended 1680)
1680–1684 In Commission:
Sir John Buckworth
Charles Duncombe
James Hoare
1684–1686 In Commission:
Thomas Neale
Charles Duncombe
James Hoare
1686–1699 Thomas Neale 
1700–1727 Sir Isaac Newton 
1727–1737 John Conduitt 
1737–1745 Hon. Richard Arundell 
1745–1769 Hon. William Chetwynd 
1769–1784 Hon. Charles Cadogan<  
1784–1789 The Earl of Effingham 
1789–1790 The Earl of Chesterfield 
1790–1794 The Earl of Leicester 
1794–1799 Sir George Yonge, 5th Baronet 
1799–1801 Lord Hawkesbury 
1801–1802 The Lord Arden 
1802–1804 John Smyth
1804–1806 The Earl Bathurst 
1806 Lord Charles Spencer 
1806–1807 Charles Bathurst 
1807–1812 The Earl Bathurst 
1812–1814 The Earl of Clancarty 
1814–1823 William Wellesley-Pole 
1823–1827 Thomas Wallace 
1827–1828 George Tierney 
1828–1830 John Charles Herries 
1830–1834 The Lord Auckland 
1834–1835 Hon. James Abercrombie 
1835 Alexander Baring 
1835–1841 Henry Labouchere 
1841–1845 William Ewart Gladstone 
1845–1846 Sir George Clerk, 6th Baronet 
1846–1850 Richard Lalor Sheil 
1850–1855 Sir John Herschel 
1855–1869 Thomas Graham
1870– Office amalgamated into the office of Chancellor of the Exchequer

Deputy Master of the Mint 
Now a private company; the job of Deputy Master is held by the Royal Mint's Chief Executive.

 1868–94	Charles Fremantle
 1894–1902	Sir Horace Seymour
 1902–13	?
 1913–17	Sir Thomas H. Elliott
 1917–22	?
 1922–38	Sir Robert A. Johnson
 1938–49	Sir John Craig
 1949–57	?
 1957–70	Sir John Hastings James
 1994      Anthony Garratt
 1999–2001 Roger Holmes
 2001–2007 Gerald Sheehan
 2007–2010 Andrew Stafford
 2010–2018 Adam Lawrence
 2018–present Anne Jessopp

See also
Münzmeister
Warden of the Mint

Notes

References

Ceremonial officers in the United Kingdom
 
Master of the Mint
Public finance of England
Public finance of Scotland
Directors of coin mints